General Rauch may refer to:

Erwin Rauch (1889–1969), German Wehrmacht lieutenant general
Hans Rauch (1899–1958), German Luftwaffe major general
John T. Rauch (fl. 1990s–2020s), U.S. Air Force major general

See also
General von Rauch (disambiguation)